Mikhaylovka is a rural locality (a selo) and the administrative center of Mikhaylovsky Selsoviet, Burlinsky District, Altai Krai, Russia. The population was 858 as of 2013. It was founded in 1909. There are 7 streets.

Geography 
Mikhaylovka is located near the Burla river and the Bolshoye Topolnoye lake, 18 km southwest of Burla (the district's administrative centre) by road. Prityka is the nearest rural locality.

References 

Rural localities in Burlinsky District